Robert Harris Hassell III (born August 15, 2001) is an American baseball outfielder in the Washington Nationals organization. He was selected eighth overall by the San Diego Padres in the 2020 MLB draft.

Amateur career
Hassell grew up in Franklin, Tennessee, and attended Independence High School, where he was both an outfielder and a starting pitcher on the baseball team. Recognized as a top collegiate prospect entering high school, Hassell committed to play college baseball at the University of Tennessee in October of his freshman year.

In his freshman season, Hassell hit .407 with 48 hits, 15 doubles, 2 home runs and 29 RBIs with 10 stolen bases and 24 runs scored and was named the Williamson County baseball player of the year. Following the season, he changed his commitment to Vanderbilt University. Hassell was named the Williamson County baseball player of the year again, as well as first team all-State by USA Today and an Underclass All-American by MaxPreps as a sophomore after batting .416 with nine doubles, six home runs and 52 RBIs. As a junior, Hassell was named the Tennessee Gatorade Player of the Year after batting .423 with 14 home runs, eight doubles, 36 RBIs and 22 stolen bases while also posting a 5-2 record with a 1.07 ERA and 113 strikeouts to 21 walks in 59 innings pitched. After the season, Hassell was named to the roster for the United States national baseball team to compete in the 2019 World Baseball Softball Confederation U-18 Baseball World Cup and won the Richard W. "Dick" Case Award as the team's most valuable player after leading the team in 10 different offensive categories. Hassell was named the WBSC International Player of the Year in December 2019. Hassell entered his senior season as one of the top high school prospects for the upcoming MLB draft and was named a preseason All-American by Baseball America.

Professional career

San Diego Padres

Hassell was selected eighth overall in the 2020 Major League Baseball draft by the San Diego Padres. Hassell signed with the Padres on June 23, 2020, for a $4.3 million bonus. After signing, he was assigned to the Padres' alternate training site as the minor-league season was canceled due to the COVID-19 pandemic.

Hassell was named to the Padres' 2021 spring training roster as a non-roster invitee. He was assigned to the Lake Elsinore Storm of the Low-A West to start the 2021 minor-league season. He was promoted to the Fort Wayne TinCaps of the High-A Central in August. On September 1, in a game versus the Great Lakes Loons, Hassell hit three home runs. Over 110 games between the two teams, he slashed .302/.393/.470 with 11 home runs, 76 RBIs, 33 doubles, and 34 stolen bases. Hassell was assigned to Fort Wayne to begin the 2022 season.

Washington Nationals
On August 2, 2022, Hassell, along with C. J. Abrams, Luke Voit, MacKenzie Gore, James Wood, and Jarlín Susana were traded to the Washington Nationals in exchange for Juan Soto and Josh Bell. The Nationals assigned him to the Wilmington Blue Rocks of the High-A South Atlantic League. Hassell played in 10 games for Wilmington before being promoted to the Harrisburg Senators of the Double-A Eastern League.

References

External links

USA Baseball profile

2001 births
Living people
Baseball outfielders
Baseball players from Tennessee
People from Franklin, Tennessee
United States national baseball team players
Lake Elsinore Storm players
Fort Wayne TinCaps players
Wilmington Blue Rocks players
Harrisburg Senators players